Fleurquin is a surname. Notable people with the surname include:

 Andrés Fleurquin (born 1975), retired Uruguayan footballer
 Carlos Hounié Fleurquin (1906–1962), Uruguayan chess master